General Fish may refer to:

Erland F. Fish (1883–1942), Massachusetts National Guard commanding general
Howard M. Fish (1923–2020), U.S. Air Force lieutenant general
Irving Fish (1881–1948), U.S. Army major general